This is a list of people who have served as Lord Lieutenant of West Lothian. The office was known as the Lord Lieutenant of Linlithgowshire until 1921.

 James Hope-Johnstone, 3rd Earl of Hopetoun 17 March 1794 – 29 May 1816
 John Hope, 4th Earl of Hopetoun 25 June 1816 – 27 August 1823
 vacant
 John Hope, 5th Earl of Hopetoun 23 November 1824 – 8 April 1843
 Archibald Primrose, 4th Earl of Rosebery 20 April 1843 – 1863
 John Alexander Hope, 6th Earl of Hopetoun 1 October 1863 – 2 April 1873
 Archibald Primrose, 5th Earl of Rosebery 5 June 1873 – 21 May 1929
 Victor Hope, 2nd Marquess of Linlithgow 8 October 1929 – 5 January 1952
 Henry Moubray Cadell 28 May 1952 – 1964
 Charles Hope, 3rd Marquess of Linlithgow 14 October 1964 – 1985
 John Douglas, 21st Earl of Morton 27 June 1985 – 2002
 Isobel Gunning Brydie 11 June 2002  – 20 Sep 2017
 Moira Niven 20 Sep 2017–

References
 

West Lothian
 
Politics of West Lothian